"Kansas City Shuffle" is the name of a 1926 jazz song.

The title of the tune refers to an advanced form of bait-and-switch confidence game employing misdirection, subterfuge, and playing on the "mark's" arrogance and/or self-loathing.

The scheme
In order for a confidence game to be a "Kansas City Shuffle", the mark must be aware, or at least suspect that he is involved in a con, but also be wrong about how the con artist is planning to deceive him. The con artist will attempt to misdirect the mark in a way that leaves him with the impression that he has figured out the game and has the knowledge necessary to outsmart the con artist, but by attempting to retaliate, the mark unwittingly performs an action that helps the con artist to further the scheme.

The title refers to a situation where the con man bets the mark money he can't identify what state "Kansas City" is in. The mark, guessing that the conman was hoping to trick him into saying Kansas, identifies Kansas City, Missouri as his answer. The con man then reveals that there is a much less well-known Kansas City, Kansas meaning Kansas was actually the correct answer.

In song
A song with the title was recorded by the "Bennie Moten's Kansas City Orchestra" jazz band on 13 December 1926 in Chicago, Illinois and originally released by Victor Records  on Victor 20406, the flip side being "Harmony Blues" by the same band.

It is one of the first songs called a "shuffle" using the distinctive triplet-driven beat.

The recording is an instrumental. The tune structure is similar to the standard I Wish I Could Shimmy Like My Sister Kate. After a short piano introduction, the band plays 2 ensemble choruses with breaks by trumpeter Lammar Wright, Sr. This is followed by solos by banjo and saxophone, a stop time chorus featuring unison work by the reeds, trombone solo, and finally out chorus ensemble.

In film
A Kansas City Shuffle was introduced by Mr. Goodkat/Smith (Bruce Willis) in the 2006 film Lucky Number Slevin in the bus terminal scene, where he explained that a Kansas City Shuffle is where "They look right...  ...and you...  go left." In the movie, the targets are manipulated into hiring their own killers, one of whom they believe to be a patsy.

References

External links
 Bennie Moten discography

1926 compositions
Confidence tricks
Deception
History of Kansas City, Missouri